Neptune is an unincorporated community in Mercer County, in the U.S. state of Ohio.

History
Neptune was laid out in 1837. A post office was established at Neptune in 1839, and remained in operation until 1905.

Notable person
Lemuel Herbert Murlin, a president of Boston University, was born near Neptune in 1861.

References

Unincorporated communities in Mercer County, Ohio
Unincorporated communities in Ohio